Qohrud Rural District is a rural district (dehestan) in Qamsar District, Kashan County, Isfahan Province, Iran. At the 2006 census, its population was 1,627, in 581 families.  The rural district has 8 villages.

References 

Rural Districts of Isfahan Province
Kashan County